Xanthodura trucidata is a species of moth in the family Geometridae first described by Arthur Gardiner Butler in 1880. It is known from Madagascar.

References
Butler, A. G. (1880). "On a collection of Lepidoptera from Madagascar with descriptions of new genera and species". Annals and Magazine of Natural History. (5)5: 333–344, 384–39.

Geometrinae
Moths of Madagascar
Moths of Africa